Wascott is an unincorporated community in the town of Wascott, Douglas County, Wisconsin, United States.

The community is located 12.5 miles south of Solon Springs; and 45 miles southeast of the city of Superior.

U.S. Highway 53 and County Road T are two of the main routes in the community.

History
A post office called Wascott was established in 1902, and remained in operation until it was discontinued in 1995. The community was named for W. A. Scott, a railroad official.

References

Unincorporated communities in Douglas County, Wisconsin
Unincorporated communities in Wisconsin